Wolfgang Webner (23 April 1937 – 2020) was a German volleyball player who competed for East Germany in the 1968 Summer Olympics and in the 1972 Summer Olympics. He was born in Breslau. In 1968 he was part of the East German team which finished fourth in the Olympic tournament. He played eight matches. Four years later he won the silver medal with the East German team in the 1972 Olympic tournament. He played all seven matches.

References

External links
 
 

1937 births
2020 deaths
German men's volleyball players
Olympic volleyball players of East Germany
Volleyball players at the 1968 Summer Olympics
Volleyball players at the 1972 Summer Olympics
Olympic silver medalists for East Germany
Sportspeople from Wrocław
Olympic medalists in volleyball
People from the Province of Lower Silesia
Medalists at the 1972 Summer Olympics